Kusmara is a town and a nagar panchayat in Mainpuri district in the Indian state of Uttar Pradesh.

Demographics
 India census, Kusmara had a population of 9,091. Males constitute 53% of the population and females 47%. Kusmara has an average literacy rate of 64%, higher than the national average of 59.5%:

References

Cities and towns in Mainpuri district